The Amalgamated Center, also known as the Amalgamated Clothing Workers of America Office Building, was built by the Bethany Brotherhood, which was funded by John Wanamaker, in 1900, in Philadelphia. The building was added to in 1912, and served as a working class social club and community center.  In 1934 the building was sold to the Amalgamated Clothing Workers of America labor union which expanded the building in 1937 and 1967. During the 1980s the building was made into doctors' offices and a day care center.

The building was listed on the National Register of Historic Places in 2008.

See also
 National Register of Historic Places listings in Center City, Philadelphia

References

Buildings and structures on the National Register of Historic Places in Philadelphia
Rittenhouse Square, Philadelphia